Fulvoclysia defectana is a species of moth of the  family Tortricidae. It is found in Russia (Transcaucasia) and Turkey.

References

Moths described in 1870
Cochylini